The Plant List has 250 accepted species names (including two primary hybrids) and 9 subspecies or varieties for the genus Pelargonium as of 2012.

A
Pelargonium abrotanifolium Jacq.
Pelargonium acetosum (L.) L'Hér.
Pelargonium aciculatum E.M.Marais
Pelargonium acraeum R.A.Dyer
Pelargonium aestivale E.M.Marais
Pelargonium album J.J.A.van der Walt
Pelargonium alchemilloides (L.) Aiton
Pelargonium alpinum Eckl. & Zeyh.
Pelargonium alternans J.C.Wendl.
Pelargonium althaeoides (L.) L'Hér.
Pelargonium anethifolium Harv.
Pelargonium angustifolium DC.
Pelargonium antidysentericum (Eckl. & Zeyh.) Kostel.
Pelargonium apetalum P.Taylor
Pelargonium appendiculatum (L.f.) Willd.
Pelargonium aridum R.A.Dyer
Pelargonium aristatum (Sweet) G.Don
Pelargonium artemisiifolium DC.
Pelargonium articulatum Willd.
Pelargonium asarifolium (Sweet) D.Don
Pelargonium astragalifolium Jacq.
Pelargonium attenuatum Harv.
Pelargonium auritum (L.) Willd.
Pelargonium auritum subsp. carneum (Harv.) J.J.A.van der Walt
Pelargonium australe Willd.

B
Pelargonium barbatum Jacq.
Pelargonium barklyi Scott-Elliot
Pelargonium betulinum (L.) L'Hér. ex Aiton
Pelargonium bicolor Aiton
Pelargonium bifolium Willd.
Pelargonium bijugum Steud.
Pelargonium boranense Friis & Gilbert
Pelargonium bowkeri Harv.
Pelargonium brevipetalum N.E.Br.
Pelargonium brevirostre E.Mey. ex Knuth
Pelargonium bubonifolium Pers.
Pelargonium burtoniae L.Bolus

C
Pelargonium caespitosum Turcz.
Pelargonium caffrum (Eckl. & Zeyh.) Steud.
Pelargonium caledonicum L.Bolus
Pelargonium calviniae Knuth.
Pelargonium campestre Harv.
Pelargonium candicans Spreng.
Pelargonium capillare Willd.
Pelargonium capitatum (L.) L'Hér.
Pelargonium capituliforme R.Knuth
Pelargonium carneum Jacq.
Pelargonium carnosum (L.) L'Hér.
Pelargonium caroli-henrici B.Nord.
Pelargonium caucalifolium Jacq.
Pelargonium caucalifolium subsp. convolvulifolium J.J.A.van der Walt
Pelargonium cavanillesii R.Knuth
Pelargonium caylae Humbert
Pelargonium ceratophyllum L'Hér.
Pelargonium chamaedryfolium Jacq.
Pelargonium chelidonium DC.
Pelargonium citronellum J.J.A.van der Walt
Pelargonium columbinum Jacq.
Pelargonium confertum E.M.Marais
Pelargonium cordifolium Curtis
Pelargonium coronopifolium Jacq.
Pelargonium cortusaefolium L'Hér.
Pelargonium cradockense R.Knuth
Pelargonium crassicaule L'Hér.
Pelargonium crassipes Harv.
Pelargonium crinitum Harv.
Pelargonium crispum (P.J.Bergius) L'Hér.
Pelargonium crithmifolium Sm.
Pelargonium cucullatum (L.) L'Hér.
Pelargonium cucullatum subsp. strigifolium Volschenk
Pelargonium curviandrum E.M.Marais

D
Pelargonium dasyphyllum E.Mey. ex Knuth
Pelargonium denticulatum Jacq.
Pelargonium desertorum Vorster
Pelargonium dichondrifolium DC.
Pelargonium dipetalum L'Hér.
Pelargonium dispar N.E.Br.
Pelargonium divisifolium Vorster
Pelargonium dodonaei Hoffmanns.
Pelargonium dolomiticum R.Knuth

E
Pelargonium echinatum Curtis
Pelargonium elegans Willd.
Pelargonium ellaphieae E.M.Marais
Pelargonium elongatum Salisb.
Pelargonium englerianum R.Knuth
Pelargonium ensatum DC.
Pelargonium erlangerianum Kunth
Pelargonium exhibens Vorster
Pelargonium exstipulatum L'Hér.

F
Pelargonium fasciculaceum E.M.Marais
Pelargonium fergusoniae L.Bolus
Pelargonium fissifolium Pers.
Pelargonium frutetorum R.A.Dyer
Pelargonium fruticosum Willd.
Pelargonium fulgidum L'Hér.
Pelargonium fumariifolium R.Knuth
Pelargonium fumarioides L'Hér. ex Harv.

G
Pelargonium gibbosum (L.) L'Hér. ex Aiton
Pelargonium gilgianum Schltr. ex Knuth
Pelargonium glechomoides A.Rich.
Pelargonium glutinosum (Jacq.) L'Hér.
Pelargonium gracilipes R.Knuth
Pelargonium gracillimum Fourc.
Pelargonium grandicalcaratum R.Knuth
Pelargonium grandiflorum Willd.
Pelargonium graveolens L'Hér.
Pelargonium grenvilleae Harv.
Pelargonium greytonense J.J.A.van der Walt
Pelargonium griseum R.Knuth
Pelargonium grossularioides (L.) L'Hér.

H
Pelargonium hantamianum R.Knuth
Pelargonium harveyanum Schltr. ex Knuth
Pelargonium hemicyclicum Hutch. & C.A.Sm.
Pelargonium heracleifolium Lodd.
Pelargonium hermanniifolium Jacq.
Pelargonium heterophyllum Jacq.
Pelargonium hirtum Jacq.
Pelargonium hispidum Willd.
Pelargonium hypoleucum Turcz.
Pelargonium hystrix Harv.

I
Pelargonium incarnatum (L.) Moench
Pelargonium incrassatum Sims
Pelargonium inodorum Willd.
Pelargonium inquinans (L.) L'Hér.
Pelargonium iocastum Steud.
Pelargonium ionidiflorum Steud.

K
Pelargonium karooicum Compton & Barnes
Pelargonium klinghardtense R.Knuth

L
Pelargonium laciniatum R.Knuth
Pelargonium ladysmithianum R.Knuth
Pelargonium laevigatum Willd.
Pelargonium lanceolatum J.Kern
Pelargonium leipoldtii R.Knuth
Pelargonium leptum L.Bolus
Pelargonium leucophyllum Turcz.
Pelargonium lobatum (Burm.f.) L'Hér.
Pelargonium longicaule Jacq.
Pelargonium longiflorum Hedw.
Pelargonium longifolium Jacq.
Pelargonium luridum (Andrews) Sweet
Pelargonium luteolum N.E.Br.
Pelargonium luteum G.Don

M
Pelargonium madagascariense Baker
Pelargonium magenteum J.J.A.van der Walt
Pelargonium malacoides R.Knuth
Pelargonium marginatum Knuth
Pelargonium moniliforme Harv.
Pelargonium mossambicense Engl.
Pelargonium multibracteatum Hochst. ex A.Rich.
Pelargonium multicaule Jacq.
Pelargonium multicaule subsp. subherbaceum (R.Knuth) J.J.A.van der Walt
Pelargonium multiradiatum J.C.Wendl.
Pelargonium myrrhifolium (L.) L'Hér.

N
Pelargonium namaquense R.Knuth
Pelargonium nelsonii Burtt Davy
Pelargonium nephrophyllum E.M.Marais
Pelargonium nervifolium Jacq.
Pelargonium nivenii Harv.

O
Pelargonium oblongatum E.Mey. ex Harv.
Pelargonium ocellatum J.J.A.van der Walt
Pelargonium ochloleucum Harv.
Pelargonium odoratissimum (L.) L'Hér.
Pelargonium oenothera Jacq.
Pelargonium oppositifolium Schltr.
Pelargonium oreophilum Schltr.
Pelargonium otaviense R.Knuth
Pelargonium ovale L'Hér.
Pelargonium ovale subsp. veronicifolium (Eckl. & Zeyh.) Hugo
Pelargonium ovale var. blattarium (Sweet) Harv.
Pelargonium ovalifolium DC.
Pelargonium oxalidifolium Harv.
Pelargonium oxaloides Willd.

P
Pelargonium panduriforme Eckl. & Zeyh.
Pelargonium paniculatum Jacq.
Pelargonium papilionaceum (L.) L'Hér. ex Aiton
Pelargonium parvipetalum E.M.Marais
Pelargonium parvirostre R.A.Dyer
Pelargonium parvulum DC.
Pelargonium patulum Jacq.
Pelargonium patulum var.tennuilobum (Eckl. & Zeyh.) Harv.
Pelargonium peltatum (L.) L'Hér.
Pelargonium petroselinifolium G.Don
Pelargonium pillansii Salter
Pelargonium pilosum Pers.
Pelargonium pinnatum (L.) L'Hér.
Pelargonium plurisectum Salter
Pelargonium polycephalum E.Mey.
Pelargonium praemorsum F.Dietr.
Pelargonium procumbens Pers.
Pelargonium proliferum Steud.
Pelargonium pseudofumarioides R.Knuth
Pelargonium pseudoglutinosum R.Knuth
Pelargonium pulchellum Sims
Pelargonium pulcherrimum Leight.
Pelargonium pulverulentum Colv. ex Sweet
Pelargonium punctatum Willd.

Q
Pelargonium quercifolium (L.f.) L'Hér.
Pelargonium quinquelobatum Hochst. ex Rich.

R
Pelargonium radens H.E.Moore
Pelargonium radiatum Pers.
Pelargonium radicatum Vent.
Pelargonium radula (Cav.) L'Hér.
Pelargonium radulifolium Harv.
Pelargonium ramosissimum Willd.
Pelargonium ranunculophyllum Baker
Pelargonium rapaceum (L.) L'Hér.
Pelargonium reflexum Pers.
Pelargonium reniforme Curtis
Pelargonium reticulatum DC.
Pelargonium revolutum Pers.
Pelargonium ribifolium Jacq.
Pelargonium rustii R.Knuth

S
Pelargonium salmoneum R.A.Dyer
Pelargonium scabroide R.Knuth
Pelargonium scabrum (L.) L'Hér.
Pelargonium schizopetalum Sweet
Pelargonium semitrilobum Jacq.
Pelargonium senecioides L'Hér.
Pelargonium sericifolium J.J.A.van der Walt
Pelargonium setosiusculum R.Knuth
Pelargonium setulosum Turcz.
Pelargonium sibthorpiifolium Harv.
Pelargonium sidifolium R.Knuth
Pelargonium sidoides DC.
Pelargonium spathulatum DC.
Pelargonium spinosum Willd.
Pelargonium squamulosum R.Knuth
Pelargonium stipulaceum Willd.
Pelargonium stipulaceum subsp. ovato-stipulatum (Knuth) Vorster
Pelargonium sublignosum R.Knuth
Pelargonium suburbanum Clifford ex Boucher
Pelargonium suburbanum subsp. bipinnatifidum (Harv.) Boucher
Pelargonium sulphureum R.Knuth

T
Pelargonium tabulare L'Hér.
Pelargonium tenellum G.Don
Pelargonium tenuicaule R.Knuth
Pelargonium ternatum Jacq.
Pelargonium ternifolium Vorster
Pelargonium tetragonum L'Hér.
Pelargonium tomentosum Jacq.
Pelargonium tongaense Vorster
Pelargonium torulosum E.M.Marais
Pelargonium transvaalense R.Knuth
Pelargonium triandrum E.M.Marais
Pelargonium tricolor Curt.
Pelargonium trifidum Jacq.
Pelargonium trifoliolatum E.M.Marais
Pelargonium triphyllum Jacq.
Pelargonium triste (L.) L'Hér.
Pelargonium tysonii Szyszył.

U
Pelargonium undulatum Pers.

V
Pelargonium viciifolium DC.
Pelargonium vinaceum E.M.Marais
Pelargonium violiflorum DC.
Pelargonium vitifolium (L.) L'Hér.

W
Pelargonium whytei Baker
Pelargonium woodii R.Knuth

X
Pelargonium xerophyton Schltr. ex Knuth

Z
Pelargonium zonale (L.) L'Hér. ex Aiton

Primary hybrids
Pelargonium × domesticum L.H.Bailey
Pelargonium × fragrans Willd.
Pelargonium × hortorum L.H.Bailey

Unresolved names
Pelargonium australe
Pelargonium cotyledonis
Pelargonium drummondii
Pelargonium insularis
Pelargonium laxum
Pelargonium littorale
Pelargonium rodneyanum
Pelargonium sp. Striatellum (undescribed)

Notes

References

External links
 The Pelargonium Page: descriptions of botanical species with plant and habitat photos, illustrations and literature

List
Pelargonium